Li Zicheng (born 10 April 1990) is a Chinese athlete who competed in the marathon at the 2012 Summer Olympics. He did not finish the race.

See also 
China at the 2012 Summer Olympics - Athletics
Athletics at the 2012 Summer Olympics – Men's marathon

References 

1990 births
Living people
Chinese male long-distance runners
Athletes (track and field) at the 2012 Summer Olympics
Olympic athletes of China
Runners from Shandong
Chinese male marathon runners
People from Binzhou